Ernst Haffner was a German social worker, journalist, and novelist whose only known novel, Blood Brothers, originally titled “Jugend auf der Landstrasse Berlin” (“Youth on the Road to Berlin”), was published in 1932 to critical acclaim by Bruno Cassirer and banned by the Nazis one year later. Sometime over the course of World War II, all traces of Haffner were lost, including any professional and personal records that may have helped to indicate what led to his disappearance. There is just a single entry for him in the Berlin registry, where Haffner lived between 1925 and 1933. At the end of the 1930s, it is documented that he was summoned to appear at the Nazi Reichsschrifttumskammer (a writer’s union affiliated with the Third Reich), after which the details of his life remain unknown.

Work 
Published in the last year before Hitler’s rise to power, Blood Brothers received a positive review by famed sociologist and philosopher Siegfried Kracauer in the Frankfurter Zeitung upon publication.

The book was subject to the 1933 Nazi book burnings.

Blood Brothers, titled Blutsbrüder in German, was reissued in 2013 by the German publishing house Metrolit Verlag (Berlin) . The first English edition, titled Blood Brothers, translated by Michael Hofmann was published in 2015.

References

External links 
  English language magazine published in Berlin.
  German online culture magazine article (in German).
  German-American Opinion: Politics and Culture blog (in English).

Year of birth missing
Year of death missing
German social workers
20th-century German novelists
German male novelists
20th-century German male writers